A medical writer, also referred to as medical communicator, is a person who applies the principles of clinical research in developing clinical trial documents that effectively and clearly describe research results, product use, and other medical information. 
The medical writer develops any of the five modules of the Common Technical Document. The medical writers also ensure that their documents comply with regulatory, journal, or other guidelines in terms of content, format, and structure.

Medical writing as a function became established in the pharmaceutical, medical device industry and Contract Research Organizations (CROs) because the industry recognized that it requires special skill to produce well-structured documents that present information clearly and concisely. All new drugs go through the increasingly complex process of clinical trials and regulatory procedures that lead to market approval. This demand for the clear articulation of medical science, drives the demand for well written, standards-compliant documents that medical professionals can easily and quickly read and understand. Similarly, medical institutions engage in translational research, and some medical writers have experience offering writing support to the principal investigators for grant applications and specialized publications.

The medical writing market is estimated to be USD 3.36 billion in 2020 and is growing at a 12.1% compound annual growth rate.

Overview 

Medical writing for the pharmaceutical industry can be classified as either regulatory medical writing or educational medical writing.

Regulatory medical writing means creating the documentation that regulatory agencies require in the approval process for drugs, devices and biologics. Regulatory documents can be huge and are formulaic. They include clinical study protocols, clinical study reports, patient informed consent forms, investigator brochures and summary documents (e.g. in Common Technical Document [CTD] format) that summarize and discuss the data a company gathers in the course of developing a medical product.

Educational medical writing means writing documents about drugs, devices and biologics for general audiences, and for specific audiences such as health care professionals. These include sales literature for newly launched drugs, data presentations for medical conferences, medical journal articles for nurses, physicians and pharmacists, consumer education and programs and enduring materials for continuing education (CE) or continuing medical education (CME). It plays a very important role in promotion of various pharmaceutical brands both to the HCPs and the consumers. Different types of communication use different media to present the writings.

Other types of medical writing include journalism and marketing, both of which can have a medical writing focus.

Regardless of the type of medical writing, companies either assign it to an in-house writer, or "outsource" it to a freelance or contract medical writer.

Organizations 
Several professional organizations represent medical writers around the world. These include:
 American Medical Writers Association (AMWA)
 Australasian Medical Writers Association (AMWA)
 European Medical Writers Association (EMWA)
 Indian Medical Writers Association (IMWA)
 Chinese Medical Writers Community (CMWC)
These organizations provide a forum where medical writers meet and share knowledge and experience. They promote professional development and standards of documentation excellence, and help writers find career opportunities. All these organizations offer fundamental medical writing training.

Books on medical writing
Stephanie Deming of the Council of Science Editors compiled in 2003 a list of books that might be helpful in medical and/or science writing. In 1978 the BMJ editor Stephen Lock recommended Hawkins's 1967 book Speaking and writing in medicine and 4 other books.

Importance of lucidity

See also
 AMWA Journal
 Medical ghostwriting
 Scientific writing
 World Association of Medical Editors (WAME)

References

Medical literature
Writings by topic
 
Health research